This is a list of horses that finished in first, second and third places, and the number of starters, in the General George Handicap, a Grade 2, seven-furlong American thoroughbred sprint race at Laurel Park Racecourse in Laurel, Maryland.

In 2013, Brigand finished second, but was disqualified to 5th.

†  designates an American Champion or Eclipse Award  winner.

References 

 The 2008 General George Handicap at the NTRA

See also 

 General George Handicap
 Laurel Park Racecourse

External links
Laurel Park racetrack

Horse racing-related lists
Laurel Park Racecourse